Kuo Lee Chien-Fu (born March 24, 1969 in Taoyuan County, Taiwan (now Taoyuan City)) is a retired Taiwanese professional baseball pitcher and currently a baseball coach. He is best known for being the ace pitcher in the Chinese Taipei national baseball team in the 1992 Olympics where he was twice the winning pitcher in the two Chinese Taipei versus Japan matches, one in the preliminary round and the other in the semifinal. The two victories helped the Chinese Taipei team win the silver medal that year. He was also a member of the Chinese Taipei national baseball team in the 1988 Olympics when baseball was a demonstration sport, but did not play in any of the tournament's matches due to his juniority at that time.

After the 1992 Olympics Kuo Lee joined the Hanshin Tigers. However, during his 6-year career with the Tigers he performed only moderately and was waived by the end of 1998. Right after the waiver Kuo Lee represented the Chinese Taipei national baseball team in the 1998 Asian Games, but was allowed 7 runs in within only 2 innings in the Chinese Taipei versus South Korea match, only could see the Chan-ho Park-led South Korean team slaughtering Taiwan. His fame accumulated since 1992 suddenly vanished: Taiwan Major League immediately announced "we do not have any plan to acquire Kuo Lee" right after this fiasco. He later sought to join CPBL's Chinatrust Whales and stayed with the team until his final retirement in late 2003. He currently coaches local college baseball team.

Career statistics
1992 Olympics:
{|border=1　　　　　　　　　　　　　　　　
|- style="background:LIGHTGREY" align=middle
|ERA||Games||W||L||IP||HR||Hits Allowed||K||BB||Runs||Earned Runs
|-align=middle
|0.93||4||3||0||29||0||11||26||13||3||3
|-
|}

Nippon Professional Baseball:

Chinese Professional Baseball League:

References

External links
profile

1969 births
Living people
Asian Games bronze medalists for Chinese Taipei
Asian Games medalists in baseball
Baseball coaches
Baseball managers
Baseball players at the 1988 Summer Olympics
Baseball players at the 1992 Summer Olympics
Baseball players at the 1990 Asian Games
Baseball players at the 1998 Asian Games
Baseball players from Taoyuan City
Chinatrust Whales players
Hakka sportspeople
Hanshin Tigers players
Koos Group Whales players
Medalists at the 1992 Summer Olympics
Medalists at the 1998 Asian Games
Nippon Professional Baseball pitchers
Olympic baseball players of Taiwan
Olympic medalists in baseball
Olympic silver medalists for Taiwan
Taiwanese expatriate baseball players in Japan
Taiwanese people of Hakka descent